The 2003 Kvalserien was the 29th edition of the Kvalserien. It determined two teams of the participating ones would play in the 2003–04 Elitserien season and which four teams would play in the 2003–04 Allsvenskan season.

Tournament

External links
Tournament on hockeyarchives.info

Kvalserien
Kval